D'Ascenzo is an Italian surname. Notable people with the surname include:

 Denise D'Ascenzo (19582019), American news anchor
 Leonardo D'Ascenzo (born 1961), Italian Roman Catholic prelate
 Nicola D'Ascenzo (18711954), Italian-born American artist

See also 

 Giovanni D'Ascenzi (19202013), Italian Roman Catholic prelate

Italian-language surnames